Phyllonorycter solani is a moth of the family Gracillariidae. It is known from Argentina.

The larvae feed on Solanum species. They mine the leaves of their host plant. The mine is found on the underside of the leaf.

References

solani
Moths of South America
Moths described in 1958